(born in Osaka Prefecture, Japan) is the lead singer of the Japanese heavy metal band, Onmyo-Za.

After being part of some local bands, she and Matatabi, who is the leader and the main songwriter, formed Onmyo-za in Osaka in 1999. "Kuroneko" means a black cat and she had used that stagename before Onmyo-Za started. The other members of Onmyo-Za also use stagenames related to cats.

References 

Living people
Year of birth missing (living people)
Japanese women heavy metal singers
Japanese women rock singers
Musicians from Osaka Prefecture
20th-century Japanese women singers
20th-century Japanese singers
21st-century Japanese women singers
21st-century Japanese singers